Daskalio is a tiny, uninhabited Greek islet in the Cyclades just off the west coast of the larger island Keros, approximately 150 metres in diameter. Formerly, it was a promontory of Keros.

Archeology
The islet is believed to have been a religious center with numerous shrines and votive offerings, including intentionally broken statues, 1,500 imported stone disks, and 700 imported white pebbles.

Excavation by the Cambridge Keros Project, a joint endeavour of the University of Cambridge, the Ephorate of Antiquities of Cyclades, and the Cyprus Institute, in 2008 revealed a large Bronze Age settlement and ten years later researches from the university found evidence of advanced metalworking workshops there, dating from 2500 BCE.

The island was extensively terraced with over 10,000 tons of marble quarried on the island Naxos, six miles distant, enhancing its pyramidal shape. The lower levels featured a complex plumbing system of water conduits, among the oldest in Europe. Plant remains in soil samples included grapes, olives, figs, almonds, emmer wheat and barley, likely imported from more arable locations.

References

External links
 

Islands of Greece
Former populated places in Greece
Archaeological sites in Greece
Landforms of Naxos (regional unit)
Islands of the South Aegean
Uninhabited islands of Greece